Patrick Martin "Patsy" Flannelly (7 November 1909 – 14 October 1939) was an Irish Gaelic footballer who played as a midfielder at senior level for the Mayo county team.

Flannelly joined the team during the 1932 championship and was a regular member of the starting fifteen until his death following the conclusion of the 1939 championship. During that time he won one All-Ireland medal, five Connacht medals and six National League medals.

Flannelly experienced a successful club career with Castlebar Mitchels, winning four county championship medals.

References

1909 births
1939 deaths
Castlebar Mitchels Gaelic footballers
Connacht inter-provincial Gaelic footballers
Irish butchers
Mayo inter-county Gaelic footballers
People from Castlebar
Winners of one All-Ireland medal (Gaelic football)